Whitfield is a census-designated place (CDP) in Berks County, Pennsylvania, United States. The population was 4,733 at the 2010 census.

Geography
Whitfield is located at  (40.334392, -76.007393).

Demographics
At the 2000 census there were 2,952 people, 1,095 households, and 901 families living in the CDP. The population density was 4,395.1 people per square mile (1,701.2/km). There were 1,102 housing units at an average density of 1,640.7/sq mi (635.1/km).  The racial makeup of the CDP was 96.31% White, 0.51% African American, 2.03% Asian, 0.71% from other races, and 0.44% from two or more races. Hispanic or Latino of any race were 1.83%.

There were 1,095 households, 35.7% had children under the age of 18 living with them, 76.1% were married couples living together, 4.2% had a female householder with no husband present, and 17.7% were non-families. 15.1% of households were made up of individuals, and 8.8% were one person aged 65 or older. The average household size was 2.68 and the average family size was 2.98.

The age distribution was 24.9% under the age of 18, 4.0% from 18 to 24, 23.7% from 25 to 44, 28.0% from 45 to 64, and 19.3% 65 or older. The median age was 43 years. For every 100 females, there were 93.2 males. For every 100 females age 18 and over, there were 90.8 males.

The median household income was $66,515 and the median family income  was $72,762. Males had a median income of $51,927 versus $39,028 for females. The per capita income for the CDP was $28,666. About 0.9% of families and 2.4% of the population were below the poverty line, including 3.9% of those under age 18 and none of those age 65 or over.

References

Census-designated places in Berks County, Pennsylvania
Census-designated places in Pennsylvania